Hiram Township may refer to the following townships in the United States:

 Hiram Township, Portage County, Ohio
 Hiram Township, Cass County, Minnesota